Calum Jordan French (born 25 August 1995) is a British amateur boxer. He is currently an active member of the GB Boxing podium squad, having represented Great Britain in four WSB fights. Having recently been selected to represent England in the 2018 Commonwealth Games in Australia's Gold Coast, French has stated his ambition is to become an Olympic champion in 2020. His most recent fights have been in the lightweight (60 kg) category.

Early life
French was born in Gateshead, Tyne and Wear to a British mother and father, Teresa French and Norman French. French attended St Annes RC Primary School in Gateshead followed by St Thomas More RC School, also in Gateshead and was known as "Frenchy" to his friends. The second youngest of 4 children, French has the following siblings: Liam, Ryan and Riona. He went to High Fell Boxing Club in Gateshead. Later on he would choose to leave and join Birtley boxing club to try and take his boxing career more seriously.

GB Boxing

In 2017, French received his first major championship medal, a bronze, at the 2017 European Amateur Boxing Championships. Along with nine other teammates, he qualified for the 2017 AIBA World Boxing Championships. French's defeat to Iurii Shestak in the semi-final brought to end a 5 year 35 fight unbeaten streak.

French was selected to represent England in the 2018 Commonwealth Games taking place in April in Australia's Gold Coast.

Competition record (WSB)
March 23, 2017
Won by unanimous decision (3:0) against	Michael Magnesi of Italy
April 21, 2017
Won by unanimous decision (3:0) against	Abdellah Boudrar of Morocco
May 20, 2017
Won by unanimous decision (3:0) against	Khalil el Hadri of France
February 16, 2018
Won by unanimous decision (3:0) against	Matteo Komadina of Croatia

11 Dec 2021  Calum French his first professional debut he won 1-0 after a 60-54 decision over Rustem Fatkhullin on the Benn vs Algieri undercard in Liverpool!

june 4th 2022 Calum French who banks eight hard rounds over Gadatamen Taylor in Cardiff on Saturday 4 June 2022 to get the decision and remains unbeaten 2-0 https://www.youtube.com/watch?v=KJsPiuSX_nM&t=1976s

Competition record (championships)
2011 England Junior National Championships - Gold

2011 Junior Three nations - Gold

2012 England Junior and Youth National Championships - Gold

2012 Junior and Youth Three nations - Gold

2013 England Junior and Youth National Championships - Gold

2013 National Association Boys Clubs - Gold

2015 England Boxing Elite National Championships – Gold

2015 Three Nations Championships – Gold

2016 Chemistry Cup, Germany - Gold

2016 England Boxing Elite National Championships – Gold

2016 Tammer Tournament, Finland - Gold

2017 Strandja memorial, Bulgaria - Gold

2017 European Championships, Ukraine - Bronze

2017 GB Boxing Championships, Sheffield - Gold

2018 European Union championships, Spain - Silver

2019 Golden Glove, Serbia - Bronze

2021 Socikas Tournament, Lithuania - Gold

References 

Living people
1995 births
English male boxers
Sportspeople from Gateshead
European Games competitors for Great Britain
Boxers at the 2019 European Games
Lightweight boxers